Griet Hoet (born 12 June 1978) is a Belgian para-cyclist, who won bronze in the women's time trial B at the 2020 Summer Paralympics held in Tokyo, Japan. She also represented Belgium at the 2016 Summer Paralympics held in Rio de Janeiro, Brazil where she and her pilot Anneleen Monsieur finished 8th in the Women's individual pursuit B, 14th in the Women's road race B and 15th in the Women's road time trial B. .

References

Living people
1978 births
Medalists at the 2020 Summer Paralympics
Cyclists at the 2016 Summer Paralympics
Cyclists at the 2020 Summer Paralympics
Paralympic bronze medalists for Belgium
Paralympic medalists in cycling
Belgian female cyclists
Paralympic cyclists with a vision impairment
Sportspeople from Ghent
Cyclists from East Flanders
21st-century Belgian women
Belgian blind people